King John's Hill is the site of an Iron Age hillfort located in Hampshire, in southeast England. The hill is situated in the parish of Worldham, in East Hampshire District. It is a Scheduled Ancient Monument with a list entry identification number of 1020314, and a Monument Number of 243207.

King John's Hill is a small multivallate hillfort, a fort with multiple defensive rings, and has been dated on ceramic evidence to approximately 100 BC. It was later reoccupied during the medieval period, with 13th–14th century AD building traces and pottery fragments. These have been identified as the potential remains of a hunting lodge traditionally said to have been built by King John.

Location and geology
The hill falls within the boundaries of the South Downs National Park. It is a greensand tor, with a flat top and steep sides; it is heavily wooded, with dense undergrowth.

Description

The hillfort is unusually small, and its defences were weak; the site falls in a borderline category between larger hillforts and smaller defended settlements. Although it has suffered some damage by malm quarrying, it is still well preserved. Limited archaeological excavation revealed plentiful evidence of the hill's Iron Age occupation, later medieval remains, and post-medieval activity.

The quarrying has destroyed the fort's defences on the north side of the hill, but they are elsewhere evidenced by two concentric scarps separated by a wide shelf. On the northeast side, a ridge line meets the fort, and was cut by a shallow ditch, which meets with a later boundary that runs around the base of the hill on the east side, and encloses a number of terraces on the lower slopes of the hill.

Investigation
The hill was partially excavated in 1939 and 1947. Ceramic fragments dating to the Iron Age were recovered, and two infilled storage pits were discovered. Evidence of the medieval occupation of the site was also revealed, including stonework and ceramics. Further remains date from the Tudor period, and include short lengths of wall, packed floors, bricks, tiles, and ovens. A ring-headed pin, fashioned from wire, was recovered from one of the Iron Age storage pits. The traditional association of the hill as a site of a medieval hunting lodge attributed to King John is supported by documentary evidence that a deer park existed at East Worldham at least as far back as 1372.

Notes

References

De'Athe, Robert (2013). Early Iron Age Metalworking and Iron Age/Early Romano-British Settlement Evidence Along the Barton Stacey to Lockerley Gas Pipeline. Salisbury, Wiltshire, England: Wessex Archaeology. Retrieved 2017-03-18.

Ordnance Survey (2006) [2004]. OS Explorer Map 133: Haslemere & Petersfield. .

Scheduled monuments in Hampshire
Iron Age sites in England
Hill forts in Hampshire
Medieval sites in England
John, King of England